Leptosteges flavifascialis is a moth in the family Crambidae. It was described by William Barnes and James Halliday McDunnough in 1913. It is found in North America, where it has been recorded from South Carolina to Georgia south into Florida.

Adults are on wing nearly year round.

References

Moths described in 1913
Schoenobiinae